William McNeill  (2 March 1940 – 22 April 2019) was a Scottish football player and manager. He had a long association with Celtic, spanning more than sixty years as a player, manager and club ambassador. McNeill captained Celtic's 'Lisbon Lions' to their European Cup victory in 1967 and later spent two spells as the club's manager. As a player and manager, he won 31 major trophies with Celtic.

A defender, McNeill played for Celtic for his entire senior career, and holds the club record for most appearances, a total of 822 games over 18 seasons. He was captain during their most successful era in the 1960s and 70s. The club won nine consecutive Scottish league championships and thirteen other major domestic trophies in this time, and in 1967 became the first British club to win the European Cup. He also played 29 times for Scotland.

McNeill managed Celtic for nine seasons, from 1978 to 1983 and 1987 to 1991, winning four Scottish league championships. This included a league and cup double in 1987–88, the club's centenary season. He also managed Clyde, Aberdeen, Manchester City and Aston Villa. In 2015, Celtic installed a statue outside Celtic Park of McNeill holding aloft the European Cup, an iconic image in their history.

Early life
McNeill was born on 2 March 1940 in Bellshill, Lanarkshire. His father was a soldier in the Black Watch and later the Army Physical Training Corps. Aged nine, McNeill moved to Hereford in England where his father was posted, and stayed for two and a half years. Although he already liked football, he enjoyed playing rugby union in his time there.

He moved to Motherwell and excelled playing football as centre-half at Our Lady's High School. His schoolboy performances led to him signing for the junior team Blantyre Victoria.

Playing career
McNeill was signed by Celtic for £250 in 1957 after then reserve team coach Jock Stein saw him playing for Scotland schoolboys against England. He was given the nickname Cesar after the actor Cesar Romero.

In his early career, Celtic endured some of their most difficult times, and did not win a trophy for eight years. After Stein became manager in 1965, however, the club's fortunes improved. In the 1965 Scottish Cup final, Celtic defeated Dunfermline 3–2, with McNeill scoring the winning goal. In that season he was named Scottish Footballer of the Year, the first year it was awarded.

With McNeill as captain, Celtic enjoyed their most successful period, dominating Scottish football and regularly competing in the latter stages of European competitions. They won nine Scottish League championships in a row, as well as seven Scottish Cups and six Scottish League Cups.

Celtic's greatest season was in 1966–67, when they won every competition they entered, and were the first club to win five trophies in a single season. As well as a domestic treble and the Glasgow Cup, McNeill led the team to victory in the 1967 European Cup Final. The team, which became known as the 'Lisbon Lions', defeated Inter Milan 2–1 and McNeill (whose last minute goal, a characteristic header from a set piece, had ensured progression against Vojvodina Novi Sad in the quarter-final) was the first British footballer to lift the trophy.

Following another domestic treble in 1968–69, in which another McNeill headed goal set his team on the way to a 4–0 win over Rangers in the Scottish Cup Final, Celtic again reached the European Cup final in 1970, this time losing to Feyenoord.

McNeill retired as a player in 1975, having made a club record 822 appearances for Celtic and never being substituted. He won 29 caps for Scotland, scoring 3 goals, and also played 9 times for the Scottish League XI.

Management career
After retiring as a player, McNeill began coaching Celtic Boys Club's under 16 team. He began his management career at Clyde in April 1977, before moving to Aberdeen two months later. McNeill recorded four wins, three draws from eight league matches and recorded a total of 11 out of a possible 16 points at Clyde. His last match in charge was a Glasgow Cup semi-final against Celtic, in which Celtic struck two late goals to win 4–2.

Aberdeen
McNeill was appointed Aberdeen manager in June 1977, having been recommended by Jock Stein. He succeeded Ally MacLeod. In his one season in charge, 1977–78, McNeill led Aberdeen to runners-up finishes in the league and Scottish Cup, and enjoyed a positive working relationship with the club's chairman, Dick Donald. Their performance in the league was their best since 1972, and three places above Celtic. During his season with Aberdeen, McNeill signed Gordon Strachan, Steve Archibald and Neil Simpson. When Stein retired as Celtic manager, he identified McNeill as his successor, and McNeill accepted the club's offer. He was succeeded at Aberdeen by Alex Ferguson.

Celtic
McNeill returned to a Celtic side who had finished in fifth place in 1977–78. He immediately improved the club's fortunes, as they won the league championship in 1978–79. Celtic clinched the title in their final match of the league season by beating Rangers 4–2, despite having had Johnny Doyle sent off.

His five years in charge saw Celtic win three League championships, in 1978–79, 1980–81 and 1981–82, the Scottish Cup in 1979–80 and the League Cup in 1982–83. This period saw Celtic's greatest competition come from the New Firm clubs – Aberdeen, who won the League championship in 1979–80, and Dundee United, who won the title in 1982–83.

McNeill is credited with developing young players for Celtic, such as Paul McStay and Charlie Nicholas, and making signings such as Murdo MacLeod and Davie Provan who became key players for the club through the 1980s. However, McNeill found working with Desmond White, Celtic's chairman, very difficult, and felt underpaid and underappreciated. Despite Celtic's successes, by 1983 he was being paid less than the managers of Aberdeen, Dundee United, Rangers and St Mirren. When White sold Nicholas to Arsenal, against McNeill's wishes, McNeill looked for the first available way out, and took up the offer to manage Manchester City.

Manchester City and Aston Villa
On 30 June 1983 he moved to England to manage Manchester City. Two years before being appointed by City, he had been strongly linked with the manager's job at their city rivals Manchester United, when Ron Atkinson was appointed instead. McNeill secured promotion for City after two seasons in charge (in 1984–85), and oversaw survival in their first season back in the First Division (1985–86).

He started the 1986–87 season as manager of Manchester City, but quit in September 1986 to take charge of Aston Villa. When Villa were relegated, after finishing bottom of the First Division in May 1987, McNeill stood down and was replaced by Graham Taylor. Manchester City were also relegated that season.

Return to Celtic
He then returned to Celtic, and in his first season, 1987–88, the club won the League Championship and Scottish Cup double in their centenary year. Celtic were renowned for scoring late goals that season, and in both the Cup semi-final and final scored late goals to come from behind and win 2–1. Celtic won the Scottish Cup in 1988–89, defeating Rangers 1–0 in the final.

The following two seasons were disappointing, and Celtic did not win a trophy. They lost the 1990 Scottish Cup Final to Aberdeen on penalties. Celtic's league performance was particularly poor; after finishing in third place in 1988–89, they managed only fifth in 1989–90 and third in 1990–91. This was the beginning of a period of poor results and increasing financial instability for Celtic, which continued until the club was taken over by Fergus McCann in 1994. McNeill was sacked by Celtic on 22 May 1991 after four seasons as manager, at the age of 51. In two spells he won eight trophies as Celtic manager – four League championships, three Scottish Cups and one League Cup.

After leaving Celtic he turned down several offers to return to management, including from Dundee, and worked in the media instead. He remained bitter about the manner of his departure from Celtic, until he was asked to become a club ambassador in 2009.

Hibernian

McNeill had a brief spell as football development manager at Hibernian in the later part of the 1997–98 season. He was brought in as a mentor to manager Jim Duffy, as they unsuccessfully attempted to arrest a decline in fortunes at the club. McNeill took charge of the team for one game after Duffy was sacked, even though he had been out of football since leaving Celtic in 1991 and was recovering from heart surgery. He left Hibernian at the end of the 1997–98 season.

Books
McNeill wrote three autobiographies:

Awards and recognition

McNeill was awarded the MBE in November 1974. In 2002 he was voted Celtic's greatest ever captain, and a member of Celtic's greatest team, by the club's fans. He was inducted into the Scottish Sports Hall of Fame in 2002 and the Scottish Football Hall of Fame in 2004.

In December 2015 Celtic installed a statue at the entrance to the Celtic Way outside Celtic Park, created by sculptor John McKenna. The statue, in bronze on a granite base, shows McNeill holding aloft the European Cup, an iconic image in the club's history.

In 2019, he was recognised with the "One Club Award" by Spanish club Athletic Bilbao for his achievements and loyalty to Celtic.

A short time after his death, the new sports pitch at his former school, Our Lady's High, was named in his honour.

In 2019, the Billy McNeill Commemoration Committee was created in Bellshill, and campaigned to raise funds to build a bronze sculpture of McNeill at the pedestrian area of Bellshill Cross. The statue was unveiled in November 2022.

Personal life
McNeill's maternal grandparents were from Lithuania , while his father was of Irish descent. He was Catholic.

McNeill married Liz Callaghan, a dancer on the TV variety show The White Heather Club in 1963. They had five children.

McNeill, along with former Rangers player Eric Caldow, stood as a candidate for the Scottish Senior Citizens Unity Party in the 2003 Scottish Parliament election. In 2008, he was awarded an honorary degree from the University of Glasgow.

During the 2014 Scottish independence referendum McNeill was a supporter of the Better Together campaign against Scottish independence.

It was reported in February 2017 that McNeill was suffering from dementia and was very limited in his speech. He died on 22 April 2019, aged 79.

Career statistics

Club

* Includes 3 appearances in the World Club Championship
† Includes 1 goal in the World Club Championship
NB These totals do not include appearances in the Glasgow Cup, which at the time was a senior trophy.

International appearances

International goals
Scores and results list Scotland's goal tally first.

Managerial record

Honours

Player 
Celtic
European Cup : 1966–67
Scottish League champions (9): 1965–66, 1966–67, 1967–68, 1968–69, 1969–70, 1970–71, 1971–72, 1972–73, 1973–74
Scottish Cup (7): 1964–65, 1966–67, 1968–69, 1970–71, 1971–72, 1973–74, 1974–75
Scottish League Cup (6): 1965–66, 1966–67, 1967–68, 1968–69, 1969–70, 1974–75
Drybrough Cup : 1974–75
Glasgow Cup (5) : 1961–62, 1963–64, 1964–65 , 1966–67, 1967–68

Scotland
British Home Championship (3) : 1961–62, 1963–64 (shared), 1971–72

Manager 
Celtic
Scottish League champions (4): 1978–79, 1980–81, 1981–82, 1987–88
Scottish Cup (3): 1979–80, 1987–88, 1988–89
Scottish League Cup: 1982–83
Glasgow Cup: 1981–82

Aberdeen
Scottish Premier Division: Runners-up 1977–78
Scottish Cup: Runners-up 1977–78

Manchester City
 Football League Second Division: Promotion 1984–85
 Full Members Cup: Runners-up 1985–86

Individual 
SFWA Footballer of the Year: 1964–65
 Scottish Manager of the Season: 1977–78 (SFWA precursor)
 SFWA Manager of the Year: 1987–88
Scottish Football Hall of Fame : 2004
2017 (as part of the Lisbon Lions)
Scottish Sports Hall of Fame: 2002
One Club Award: 2019

Notes

See also 
 List of one-club men in association football
 List of Scotland national football team captains

References 
 General sources
 
 

 Specific citations

External links 
 

1940 births
2019 deaths
Footballers from Bellshill
Association football central defenders
Scottish footballers
Scotland international footballers
Blantyre Victoria F.C. players
Celtic F.C. players
Scottish Football League players
Scottish Junior Football Association players
Scottish football managers
Clyde F.C. managers
Aberdeen F.C. managers
Celtic F.C. managers
Manchester City F.C. managers
Aston Villa F.C. managers
Hibernian F.C. non-playing staff
Scottish people of Lithuanian descent
Scottish politicians
Scottish Roman Catholics
Elder rights activists
Members of the Order of the British Empire
Scottish Football Hall of Fame inductees
People educated at Our Lady's High School, Motherwell
Scottish Football League representative players
Scottish Football League managers
Scotland under-23 international footballers
UEFA Champions League winning players
English Football League managers
20th-century Scottish people
21st-century Scottish people